Bitter Sweets is a 1928 American silent crime film directed by Charles Hutchison and starring Barbara Bedford, Ralph Graves and Crauford Kent.

Cast
 Barbara Bedford as Bett Kingston 
 Ralph Graves as Ralph Horton 
 Crauford Kent as Paul Gebhardt 
 Joy McKnight as Diana Van Norton 
 Ethan Laidlaw as Joe Gorman 
 Frank Hall Crane as Nick Clayton
 Richard Belfield as District Attorney 
 John Webb Dillion as Donovan 
 Oscar Smith as Jeff Washington

References

Bibliography
 Munden, Kenneth White. The American Film Institute Catalog of Motion Pictures Produced in the United States, Part 1. University of California Press, 1997.

External links
 

1928 films
1928 crime drama films
American silent feature films
American crime drama films
Films directed by Charles Hutchison
American black-and-white films
1920s English-language films
1920s American films
Silent American drama films